Pebble Creek is a stream in Stanton, Dodge, and Cuming counties, Nebraska, in the United States. It is a tributary of the Elkhorn River.

Pebble Creek was so named from the abundance of pebbles at a ford where soldiers crossed in the 1849 Pawnee War.

See also
List of rivers of Nebraska

References

Rivers of Cuming County, Nebraska
Rivers of Dodge County, Nebraska
Rivers of Stanton County, Nebraska
Rivers of Nebraska